Tephritis angulatofasciata is a species of tephritid or fruit flies in the genus Tephritis of the family Tephritidae.

Distribution
Iran.

References

Tephritinae
Insects described in 1891
Diptera of Asia
Taxa named by Josef Aloizievitsch Portschinsky